VeganBurg is the world's first 100% plant-based burger joint in the fast casual scene, established on October 10, 2010. A vegan fast casual chain of restaurants, which currently has one outlet in Singapore and one outlet in San Francisco, United States. The product range of VeganBurg includes vegan burgers, sides and desserts.

Veganburg received the 74th title from 2019 Fast Casual Top Movers and Shakers award presented by the James Beard Foundation Award.

As mentioned in the Vegetarian Society (Singapore) (VSS) Newsletter in November 2014, Miss Singapore World 2013, Maria-Anna Weiling Zenieris is working together with VeganBurg on the Meat Free Monday campaign, which is an international campaign that encourages people to go vegan or vegetarian on Mondays to improve their health and the health of the planet.

Critics
Although the majority of their products are plant-based, cholesterol free, antibiotics free, hormone free and GMO free, the production line does not fit the requirements of gluten-free diet, except the burger patties.

See also 
 Vegetarian and Vegan Restaurants in Singapore
 List of vegetarian restaurants
 Lists of restaurants
 List of hamburger restaurants

References

External links
 Official website

2015 establishments in California
Cuisine of the Western United States
Fast casual restaurants
Fast-food chains of the United States
Multinational food companies
Fast-food franchises
Restaurants established in 2010
Restaurant chains in Singapore
Fast-food chains of Singapore
Vegetarian restaurants in Singapore
Singaporean companies established in 2010